Alberto Razzetti (born 2 June 1999) is an Italian swimmer. He won the gold medal in the men's 200 metre butterfly event at both the 2021 FINA World Swimming Championships (25 m) held in Abu Dhabi, United Arab Emirates and the 2021 European Short Course Swimming Championships held in Kazan, Russia. He competed in the men's 200 metre individual medley and men's 400 metre individual medley events at the 2020 Summer Olympics in Tokyo, Japan.

Career 
In 2019, he competed at the Summer Universiade in Naples, Italy.

In 2021, he won the silver medal in the men's 400 metre individual medley and the bronze medal in the men's 200 metre individual medley at the 2020 European Aquatics Championships held in Budapest, Hungary.

On the first day of the 2022 European Aquatics Championships, held in Rome in August, Razzetti won the first gold medal for Italy at the Championships, placing first in the 400 metre individual medley with a time of 4:10.60. Five days later, he won the bronze medal in the 200 metre butterfly with a time of 1:55.01, finishing 3.00 seconds behind gold medalist Kristóf Milák of Hungary. On the seventh and final day of swimming, he won the silver medal in the 200 metre individual medley, finishing in a time of 1:57.82.

References

External links 
 

Living people
1999 births
Sportspeople from the Province of Genoa
Italian male swimmers
Male medley swimmers
Italian male butterfly swimmers
Competitors at the 2019 Summer Universiade
European Aquatics Championships medalists in swimming
Swimmers at the 2020 Summer Olympics
Olympic swimmers of Italy
Medalists at the FINA World Swimming Championships (25 m)
21st-century Italian people